Vittorio Bachelet (20 February 1926 – 12 February 1980) was an Italian academic and politician, former vice president of the High Council of the Judiciary.

On 12 February 1980, he was ambushed and murdered by the Red Brigades.

Biography 
After having attended the Azione Cattolica association, Bachelet joined the Italian Catholic Federation of University Students and graduated in Law at the Sapienza University of Rome, where he later taught. He also taught in other Universities in Pavia and Trieste.

In 1959, Bachelet was appointed vice president of Azione Cattolica by Pope John XXIII, while in 1964 he was appointed President by Pope Paul VI.

Bachelet joined Christian Democracy, being very close to Aldo Moro, and in 1976 was elected vice president of the High Council of the Judiciary (elected by all the political parties in the Parliament), after having been for a few months a city councilor in Rome.

On 12 February 1980, at the end of a lesson, while talking with his assistant Rosy Bindi, Bachelet was shot and killed by an armed group of the Red Brigades, on the mezzanine of the staircase of the Faculty of Political Sciences of La Sapienza. His funeral took place two days later at the San Roberto Bellarmino Church and was attended by President Sandro Pertini and Prime minister Francesco Cossiga.

He was the father of Giovanni Battista Bachelet, teacher of Physics at La Sapienza and Deputy for the Democratic Party from 2008 to 2013.

References 

1926 births
1980 deaths
Italian Roman Catholics
Christian Democracy (Italy) politicians
20th-century Italian politicians
Assassinated Italian politicians
Italian terrorism victims
People murdered in Lazio
Deaths by firearm in Italy